Parvati Gehlot was the first female physician from Rajasthan in India. She belongs to Jodhpur city of Rajasthan. She passed her MBBS degree in 1928 from Lady Hardinge Medical College, New Delhi and then went abroad in 1936 to England for higher studies in the field of medicine. She was very talented and later joined the government service. She then became the Superintendent of Umaid Hospital, Jodhpur.

References

20th-century Indian women physicians
Year of birth missing
Possibly living people
Medical doctors from Rajasthan